2011 Ball Hockey World Championship – Division I held in Bratislava, Slovakia. They played two groups of four teams divided. The first two teams from the group advance to the semifinals. Teams that have won in the semifinals had secured progress on Ball Hockey World Championship 2013. In this case, the finale came France and Pakistan where Pakistan won. France and Pakistan for two years show in St John's in the elite.

Group A

Group B

Match for 7th place (Division - I)

Match for 5th place (Division - I)

Play off

Semifinals

Match for 3rd place (Division - I)

Finale (Division - I)

Final standings 

Ball Hockey World Championship
Ball Hockey World Championship